This is a list of fatal accidents to competitors at the Kyalami Grand Prix Circuit during the South African Grand Prix and other national and international  motor-sport events.

List of fatal accidents involving competitors

List of fatal accidents during unofficial testing

List of fatal accidents involving race officials

Sources

Kyalami